Alvorninha is one of twelve civil parishes (freguesias) in the municipality of Caldas da Rainha, Portugal.

It is the birth location of Cardinal José da Cruz Policarpo.

References

Freguesias of Caldas da Rainha